Cevat is a given name. Notable people with the name include:

Cevat Rıfat Atilhan (1892–1967), Turkish career officer, antisemitic writer, initiator of the 1934 Thrace pogroms
Cevat Çobanlı (1870–1938), military commander of the Ottoman Army, War Minister of the Ottoman Empire
Cevat Güler (born 1959), Turkish former football player and coach
Cevat Abbas Gürer (1887–1943), officer of the Ottoman Army, the Turkish Army, politician of the Republic of Turkey
Cevat Gürkan (1907–1984), Turkish equestrian
Cevat Şakir Kabaağaçlı (1886–1973), Cretan Turk writer of novels, short-stories and essays
Cevat Kula (1902–1977), Turkish equestrian
Ahmed Cevat Pasha (1851–1900), Ottoman career officer and statesman
Cevat Prekazi (born 1957), Yugoslav-Turkish former footballer
Cevat Seyit (1906–1945), Turkish footballer
Leman Cevat Tomsu (1913–1988), Turkish architect
Refi Cevat Ulunay (1890–1968), Syrian-Turkish writer, controversial journalist and novelist during the Ottoman era
Cevat Yerli (born 1978), German computer game developer of Turkish descent
Cevat Yurdakul (1942–1979), prosecutor and the chief of police of Adana Province, Turkey, assassinated in 1979

Turkish given names